Tom Okker and Balázs Taróczy were the defending champions, but Okker did not compete this year. Taróczy teamed up with Heinz Günthardt and successfully defended his title, by defeating Raymond Moore and Andrew Pattison 6–0, 6–2 in the final.

Seeds

Draw

Draw

References

External links
 Official results archive (ATP)
 Official results archive (ITF)

Dutch Open (tennis)
1981 Grand Prix (tennis)